Mark Ray (born 2 October 1952 in Surry Hills, New South Wales) is a former Australian first-class cricket player.

Cricket career
Mark Ray played for New South Wales in the 1981–82 season, before moving to Tasmania, where he played for Tasmania from 1982-83 until he retired after the 1985–86 season. He also captained Tasmania on five occasions, becoming Tasmania's 40th captain.

A left-handed opening batsman, and slow left-arm orthodox bowler, he was a capable all-rounder, although his batting relied on a limited range of strokes and his bowling on accuracy and flight rather than spin. His highest first-class score was 94, for Tasmania against Western Australia in 1983–84. His best bowling figures were 5 for 79, for Tasmania against New South Wales in 1985–86, in his second-last match.

While playing for Tasmania, he worked as a photographer for the Examiner newspaper in Launceston. After he retired from first-class cricket, he became a cricket journalist and author, working for many years for The Age in Melbourne and The Sydney Morning Herald. He also published two books of black and white documentary photographs depicting the world of international cricket outside the field of play. In the 1990s, the Australian Cricket Society rated one of those books, "Cricket Masala", among the 50 best Australian cricket books ever published. Ray's photography can be seen at markrayphotos.com.

Books
 Geoff Lawson's Diary of the Ashes: As Told to Mark Ray 1990
 The Ashes: England in Australia 1990-91 (with Alan Lee) 1991
 Cricket: The Game Behind the Game 1994
 Border & Beyond 1995
 Shane Warne: My Own Story: As Told to Mark Ray 1997
 Cricket Masala 2002
 Long Shadows: 100 Years of Australian Cricket 2006 (editor)

See also
 List of Tasmanian representative cricketers
 List of New South Wales representative cricketers

References

External links

"Only in Tassie" by Mark Ray

1952 births
Living people
Tasmania cricketers
New South Wales cricketers
Australian cricketers
Cricketers from Sydney
Australian cricket writers